Reichenbächle is a river of Baden-Württemberg, Germany. It is a tributary of the river Schiltach near the town Schiltach.

See also
List of rivers of Baden-Württemberg

References

Rivers of Baden-Württemberg
Rivers of the Black Forest
Rivers of Germany